Elaine Ng Yi-lei (born 23 September 1972), sometimes credited as Elaine Wu, is a Hong Kong actress. She was the winner of Miss Asia in 1990.

She announced that she was pregnant in 1999, and disclosed the affair with Jackie Chan after public speculation. Soon afterwards, Chan admitted he had "only committed a fault that many men in the world commit". She gave birth to a daughter, Etta Ng Chok Lam, on 18 January 1999. Ng raised her daughter without Chan's involvement, and later disowned her daughter after her daughter came out as a lesbian at 17.

Filmography

References

External links 
 

Living people
Hong Kong television actresses
20th-century Hong Kong actresses
21st-century Hong Kong actresses
1972 births